1986 in Korea may refer to:
1986 in North Korea
1986 in South Korea